Cármen Lúcia Antunes Rocha (19 April 1954) is a Brazilian jurist and member of the Supreme Federal Court since 2006. She is the second woman to have been chosen as a justice for the Court and Chief Justice and a professor of Constitutional Law at Pontifical Catholic University of Minas Gerais. She was nominated by former President of Brazil Luiz Inácio Lula da Silva. Antunes Rocha's work has been marked by the rigor with which she tries corruption cases and her firm stance regarding women's rights.

She was President of the Superior Electoral Court of Brazil. She currently is the President of the Supreme Federal Court. She became Acting President from April 13, 2018, until April 14 of the same year, as President Michel Temer attended the VIII Summit of the Americas, and the president of the Chamber of Deputies, Rodrigo Maia, and the president of the Senate, Eunício Oliveira were outside Brazil.

At her introduction to the role she was championed by José Celso de Mello Filho, the most senior justice of the court. Lucia replaced Ricardo Lewandowski who had been known for championing a reduction in oversight and an increase in remuneration for judges. Her champion gave a speech talking about the need to remove corruption, although the event had presence of a number of alleged suspects. In 2018, the minister Dias Toffoli succeeded Carmen Lúcia as president of the Court.

References 

1954 births
Living people
Pontifical Catholic University of Minas Gerais alumni
20th-century Brazilian judges
Brazilian women judges
21st-century Brazilian judges
Constitutional court women judges
People from Minas Gerais
Supreme Federal Court of Brazil justices
Women chief justices
20th-century women judges
21st-century women judges